Paint mines may refer to:
 Calhan Paint Mines Archeological District
 Paintball equipment